was a province of Japan in the area of Japan that is today western Shizuoka Prefecture. Tōtōmi bordered on Mikawa, Suruga and Shinano Provinces. The origin of its name is the old name of Lake Hamana.

History
Tōtōmi was one of the original provinces of Japan established in the Nara period under the Taihō Code. The original capital of the province was located in what is now Iwata, and was named Mitsuke – a name which survived into modern times as Mitsuke-juku, a post station on the Tōkaidō. Under the Engishiki classification system, Tōtōmi was ranked as a "superior country" (上国) in terms of importance, and one of the 16 "middle countries" (中国) in terms of distance from the capital.

During the early Muromachi period, Tōtōmi was ruled nominally by the Imagawa clan before coming under control of the Shiba clan. However, by the Sengoku period, the Imagawa recovered  Tōtōmi and effectively annexed it to Suruga Province. After the defeat of the Imagawa at the Battle of Okehazama, Tōtōmi was divided between the powerful warlords Takeda Shingen of Kai and Tokugawa Ieyasu of Mikawa. To consolidate his new holdings, Tokugawa Ieyasu constructed Hamamatsu Castle, which effectively became the capital of the province, although parts of Tōtōmi continued to be contested between the Tokugawa and Takeda until Shingen's death.

After the Battle of Odawara and the rise to power of Toyotomi Hideyoshi, Tokugawa Ieyasu was forced to trade his domains in the Tōkai region for the Kantō region instead. Hamamatsu was relinquished to the Horii clan and subsidiary Kakegawa Castle to Yamauchi Kazutoyo. After the establishment of the Tokugawa shogunate, the Tokugawa recovered their lost territories, and reassigned Tōtōmi to various fudai daimyōs.

During the Edo period, the Tōkaidō road from Edo to Kyoto passed through Tōtōmi, with post stations at several locations.  For defensive purposes, the Tokugawa shogunate forbid the construction of bridges on the major rivers (such as at the Tenryū River), which further led to town development on the major river crossings.

At the end of the Tokugawa shogunate, Tōtōmi Province was divided among several feudal domains, which were assigned to close fudai retainers. Following the defeat of the Tokugawa shogunate during the Boshin War of the Meiji Restoration, the last Tokugawa shōgun, Tokugawa Yoshinobu returned to Suruga in 1868 to rule the short-lived Shizuoka Domain, and the existing daimyōs in Tōtōmi were reassigned to other territories, mostly in Kazusa Province

After the abolition of the han system in 1871 by the new Meiji government, during the first wave of prefectural mergers (第1次府県統合 daiichiji fu/ken tōgō), the new prefectures in Tōtōmi were merged into Hamamatsu Prefecture, with enclaves of other prefectures/exclaves in other provinces being removed, so that Hamamatsu and Tōtōmi became basically contiguous. On August 21, 1876, Hamamatsu was merged into Shizuoka Prefecture, which by that time comprised all of Suruga and Izu provinces, to form an enlarged Shizuoka Prefecture; it reached practically its present-day extent in 1878 when a part of Izu Province, namely the Izu Islands, were transferred from Shizuoka to Tokyo.

Many former samurai of the feudal domains in Tōtōmi, now unemployed due to the sudden end to feudalism, were settled in the Makinohara region, where they developed the green tea industry. With the coming of the Tōkaidō Main Line railway, Hamamatsu developed rapidly into a major commercial and industrial center, especially in connection with the cotton and silk-spinning industries.

Districts under the Ritsuryō system

 In modern times part of: Hamamatsu, Horie (a fiefdom established only in the restoration) and many other feudal domains/shogunate/crown lands/prefectures 1868 → completely Hamamatsu Prefecture 1871/72 → Shizuoka Prefecture since 1876
 Aratama District (麁玉郡) – merged into Inasa District on April 1, 1896
 Fuchi District (敷知郡) – merged into Hamana District (along with Nakagami District) on April 1, 1896
 Haibara District (榛原郡)
 Hamana District (浜名郡) – absorbed Fuchi and Nakagami Districts on April 1, 1896; now dissolved
 Inasa District (引佐郡) – absorbed Aratama District on April 1, 1896; now dissolved
 Iwata District (磐田郡) – absorbed Toyoda and Yamana Districts on April 1, 1896; now dissolved
 Kitō District (城東郡) – merged with Saya District to become Ogasa District (小笠郡) on April 1, 1896
 Nagakami District (長上郡) – merged into Hamana District (along with Fuchi District) on April 1, 1896
 Saya District (佐野郡) – merged with Kitō District to become Ogasa District on April 1, 1896
 Shūchi District (周智郡)
 Toyoda District (豊田郡) – merged into Iwata District (along with Yamana District) on April 1, 1896
 Yamana District (山名郡) – merged into Iwata District (along with Toyoda District) on April 1, 1896

Bakumatsu-period feudal division
Generally, the kokudaka nominal income did not correspond to the actual income from a given village/district/province, and in addition there were some, especially non-agricultural, sources of taxable or direct income that were not always accurately represented in the baku/han kokudaka system of the Edo period.

Note: The kokudaka given in the table is the total from within & without the province, not restricted to the parts of the domain actually located in Tōtōmi.

Note: The following figures are taken from the Japanese Wikipedia article, the database and publication series used as the original source are given in the external links.

Highways
Tōkaidō – connecting Edo with Kyoto

Notes

References
 Nussbaum, Louis-Frédéric and Käthe Roth. (2005).  Japan encyclopedia. Cambridge: Harvard University Press. ;  OCLC 58053128
 Papinot, Edmond. (1910). Historical and Geographic Dictionary of Japan. Tokyo: Librarie Sansaisha. OCLC 77691250
 Tōtōmi on "Edo 300 HTML"

External links 

  Murdoch's map of provinces, 1903
 National Museum of Japanese History: 旧高旧領取調帳データベース (Database of feudal territories and their yields) at the end of the Edo period (or shortly after, see notes)/in the Meiji restoration; digitization of: Kimura, Motoi (1969–79): 旧高旧領取調帳, 6 Volumes, Kondō Shuppansha. Search mask by province, district, village [or town/station], domain/shogunate administration or other feudal territory, early-Meiji prefecture, income, 20th century LPE code (all non-numerical entries are given as full names incl. suffixes, e.g. 遠江国 for Tōtōmi Province, 佐野郡 for Saya District, 金谷宿 for Kanaya Station, 相良町 for Sagara Town, 浜松県 for Hamamatsu Prefecture, etc.; some villages/settlements were split between several lords/territories and therefore have several database entries with fractional incomes)

 
Former provinces of Japan
History of Shizuoka Prefecture
1871 disestablishments in Japan
States and territories disestablished in 1871